Smokey Rolls Down Thunder Canyon is a Devendra Banhart album released September 25, 2007. This album features more instrumentation than the previous records, as well as more genre experimentation. Smokey Rolls Down Thunder Canyon was recorded in Topanga Canyon in Southern California and is dedicated to Alice Coltrane, Malachi Ritscher and Elliott Smith.

The majority of the merchandise sold on the US tour for the album was made in collaboration with Banhart by Adam Tullie and Angeline Rivas, who design the clothing line Cavern Collection.

Smokey Rolls Down Thunder Canyon reached #19 on Rolling Stones list of the Top 50 Albums of 2007. The song "Seahorse" is #69 on Rolling Stones list of the 100 Best Songs of 2007.

Track listing

Personnel
The current name of Banhart's band is Spiritual Bonerz (the 'z' is silent), and the line-up consists of:

 Devendra Banhart
 Noah Georgeson
 Luckey Remington
 Pete Newsom
 Greg Rogove
 Rodrigo Amarante
 Andy Cabic
Additional Musicians
 Mike Davis - Trumpet
 Noah Gladstone - Trombone
 Amy Tatum - Flutes, Tenor Saxophone

Chart performance

Footnotes

Devendra Banhart albums
2007 albums
XL Recordings albums